Giovanni Burgio (died 1469) was a Roman Catholic prelate who served as Archbishop of Palermo (1467–1469).

Biography
On 16 Nov 1467, Giovanni Burgio was appointed by Pope Paul II as Archbishop of Palermo. He served as Archbishop of Palermo until his death in 1469.

See also 
Catholic Church in Italy

References

External links and additional sources
 (for Chronology of Bishops) 
 (for Chronology of Bishops) 

1469 deaths
15th-century Italian Roman Catholic bishops
Bishops appointed by Pope Paul II